Caixin Media is a Chinese news website based in Beijing known for investigative journalism. Caixin means "New Fortune" in Chinese. Since it was established, Caixin Media has built up a business model of “News + Data,” relying on professional team and great originality. Caixin cover Chinese and English media, conferences, data and other products at multiple levels, providing accurate, comprehensive and in-depth financial coverage and information services for China's most influential audience.

Structure 
The founder and publisher is Hu Shuli, a former Knight Fellow in journalism at Stanford University, and an honorary doctorate degree recipient from Princeton University. Previously, Hu founded Caijing magazine. Yang Daming acts as deputy publisher, and Wang Shuo is editor-in-chief. The business side is headed by Zhang Lihui as executive president.

The headquarters is in the Sanlitun SOHO (三里屯SOHO) in Chaoyang District, Beijing. There are also offices in Xuhui District, Shanghai and Quarry Bay, Hong Kong.

Products

Caixin.com 
Caixin.com is a must-read for understanding China's financial and business world, with multimedia products that integrate news, opinion and analysis. It offers high-quality and original content 24/7 from an objective and professional perspective.

Caixin Weekly 
As a leading national weekly catering to political, financial, industrial and academic leaders, Caixin Weekly provides unbiased reporting and insightful, in-depth analysis on financial and business news and current affairs, and chronicles China's ongoing process of reform and opening-up.

Caixin Video & Audio 
Caixin offers a wide range of professional video and audio programs including general news features, interviews and discussions with public figures in business and finance through internal platforms including Caixin.com and Caixin app and external platforms covering Tencent video, iQIYI and YouTube, etc.

History

Departure from Caijing Magazine 
Caixin Media was established in January 2010, created subsequently to the departure of Hu Shuli and the majority of the editors and reporters at Caijing Magazine in November 2009.  The original staff of Caixin Media is composed entirely of employees from Caijing.

Caijing is a financial news magazine. It was founded by Hu Shuli in 1998 and was managed by the Stock Exchange Executive Council (SEEC) whose chairman is Wang Boming, The magazine's ability to push the boundaries in news coverage largely depends on the political protection afforded by SEEC, its well-connected backer.

In November 2009, Hu Shuli resigned from Caijing along with a large portion of Caijings journalists after weeks of conflicts with Caijings controller over issues including "its coverage of sensitive current affairs stories". The magazine had been well known for its investigative reporting and in-depth business articles; but its backer, according to departing employees, wanted it "to move away from investigative journalism towards straight coverage of business, in the mode of Fortune". The pressure to focus on finance had mounted substantially since the explosion of ethnic violence in Xinjiang in July 2009; reporters at Caijing received orders from SEEC to remove sensitive stories, despite SEEC's promises not to interfere in editorial decision-making. Except that, there were also disputes over wages. Jeremy Goldkorn, founder and editor of Danwei, a China-focused blog, called Hu's departure from Caijing "a big loss for SEEC". "No one will take Caijing seriously now," he said. "Hu Shuli is almost half the brand, if not more."

Caixin launched a simple English-language news site called "Caixin Online" in 2010, translating a small number of its Chinese stories each day for foreign readers. In 2016, it greatly expanded that presence with the establishment of a separate company called Caixin Global, with Hu Shuli as CEO and Li Xin as managing director. It included a new English language news app, a new English language website (www.caixinglobal.com) upgraded from Caixin Online, and a range of customized business intelligence services under the banner of Caixin Global Intelligence.

The Caixin China PMI is an economic index compiled and published monthly by IHS Markit; it is often cited by market watchers and media. Caixin Media took over sponsorship of Markit's China PMI from HSBC in 2015, and the research team of Caixin Insight provides analysis for the index.

In April 2018, Caixin Global and CITIC Capital jointly acquired the international business information unit of Britain's Euromoney for $180.5 million, marking one of the biggest offshore purchases ever by a mainstream Chinese media company. The unit, Global Market Intelligence Division (GMID), was a provider of global financial information and data in over 15 languages, with a focus on emerging markets. GMID's two main units are CEIC and EMIS.

Establishment of Caixin 
Two months after splitting with Caijing, Hu Shuli established Caixin Media and became the executive editor of a new publication called Caixin Weekly.

Caixin Media was invested by various parties. Hu secured a 40-million yuan investment from Zhejiang Daily Press Group, the state-owned newspaper conglomerate, for a 40 percent stake in Caixin. Zhejiang Daily had sought to sell a 19.77 percent stake in Caixin for 56 million yuan in 2011, but later withdrew the sale. In July 2012, Hu won another shot in the arm when Tencent, one of China's largest internet firms, became Caixin's newest stockholder with an undisclosed amount of shares. In December 2013, China Media Capital (CMC) said that it had purchased 40% stake in Caixin Media from Zhejiang Daily Press Group, thus becoming the largest shareholder. Li Ruigang, the chairman of CMC, said, "My fund and I are very honored to become a part of Caixin"; "Our common goal is to build a China-based financial media platform with international influences."

Introduction of paywall 
Caixin Media initially offered content from its website, caixin.com, and its mobile app for free, but charged for the electronic version of its signature magazine. On November 6, 2017, it set up a paywall for caixin.com, becoming the first major Chinese publication to put most of its online content behind a paywall.

The paywall's introduction was part of Caixin's efforts to protect content from copyright infringement and to boost revenue. In May 2018, Hu Shuli, in a speech to students at Renmin University of China, said that many readers had subscribed since testing of the paywall model began in 2016, proving that the market had a positive response to the paywall model.

In an interview in November 2018, one year after the paywall's introduction, Hu Shuli said Caixin had more than 200,000 digital annual subscribers. Caixin's Chinese language website caixin.com receives approximately 130 million page views per month from 50 million unique visitors. Hu said that readership had risen steadily.

In June 2022, Caixin has around 850,000 digital subscribers, according to a new ranking by the International Federation of Periodical Publishers (FIPP). Caixin subscriptions have grown 21% since the first half of 2021, meaning it has overtaken Nikkei.com to become the world’s largest digital news subs business outside of the English-speaking world. Caixin Media's paid readership exceeded 900,000 at the end of October, after the outlet became the world's largest subscription-based media outside the U.K. and the U.S. earlier this year, Publisher Hu Shuli announced at the 13th Caixin Summit.

Notable events 
On 7 March 2016, Caixin published an article that exposed the Cyberspace Administration of China for removing an article on their Chinese website. The reasoning given for the take-down order was "illegal content". The censored article, originally published on March 3, was about Jiang Hong, a member of the Chinese People’s Political Consultative Conference, who said that advisors should be "free to give Communist Party and government agencies suggestions on economic, political, cultural and social issues". Publicly exposing such censorship was considered highly unusual in China, and Caixin deliberately referred to the CAC as "a government censorship organ".

On 11 November 2018, Caixin reporter Zhou Chen was harassed by police in her hotel room while on a trip to investigate a petrochemical leak in Quanzhou that sickened over 50 people. The incident prompted outrage on social media and a rare apology from the local police.

On 27 March 2020, doubts were raised about the accuracy of the reported COVID-19 death toll of 2,535 in Wuhan as Caixin published photos of a truck unloading 2,500 boxed funeral urns arriving from a Hankou funeral home and a further 3,500 boxed funeral urns inside Jingya Hall.

On 21 October 2021, the Cyberspace Administration of China removed Caixin from its seminal list of news media that can be re-published, substantially gagging it as a news source.

References

External links

Publishing companies of China
Chinese companies established in 2010
Mass media in China